The Ndogo Lagoon is located in the southwestern part of Gabon. Setté Cama and Gamba are two known places that lie on its banks. The Ndogo Lagoon has about 350 islands. Sport fishing is popular in the area, and close to the mouth of the lagoon are fish including barracuda, carrangue, redfish, captaine, tuna, and tarpon.

Lagoons of Gabon